Islam is practiced by several Muslim American groups in Metro Detroit.

History

The first mosque in the city was the Highland Park Mosque, and the first imams who lived in Detroit were Kalil Bazzy and
Hussein Adeeb Karoub. This first mosque failed in 1922. A multiethnic coalition founded the Universal Islamic Society (UIS), the city's second mosque, in 1925.

Early Muslim communities in Detroit "navigated turbulent periods of xenophobia, racism (anti-black and anti-Asian), Orientalist stereotyping, anti-Muslim prejudice, economic depression, and war." By the mid-20th century, however, Muslims in Detroit were seen as an upwardly-mobile, modern group on "easy terms with American patriotism." During this time, while the first national organizations for the advancement of Muslim issues began to sprout up across the county, many Muslim activists, political and spiritual leaders began to rise to prominence in Detroit. The city was seen as "a harbinger of successful Muslim incorporation in American society... by Muslims and non-Muslims alike." 

The character changed in Detroit's Islam in the 1970s when the conversions of the members of the Nation of Islam to mainstream Islam took place, and when immigration from India, southern Lebanon, Pakistan, and Palestine occurred. B. D. Singleton of the California State University, San Bernardino wrote that the older Muslim population were often "marginalized or shut out of" institutions they themselves had created.

In the 2000s a Bengali mosque in Hamtramck named the Al-Islah Jamee Masjid wanted permission to broadcast the adhan, the Islamic call to prayer, from loudspeakers outside of the mosque and requested this permission from the city government. It was one of the newer mosques in Hamtramck. Sally Howell, author of Competing for Muslims: New Strategies for Urban Renewal in Detroit, wrote that the request "brought to a head simmering Islamophobic sentiments" in Hamtramck. Muslims and interfaith activists supported the mosque. Some anti-Muslim activists, including some from other states including Kentucky and Ohio, participated in the controversy. Howell added that the controversy, through an "international media storm", gave "a cathartic test of the 'freedoms' we were said to be 'fighting for' in Afghanistan and Iraq" to the remainder of the United States. In 2004 the city council voted unanimously to allow mosques to broadcast the adhan on public streets, making it one of the few U.S. cities to allow this to occur. Some individuals had strongly objected to the allowing of the adhan.

In 2013 the city council of Hamtramck became the first in the U.S. that was Muslim majority.

By 2015 many Muslim women in the Detroit area asked to be able to wear hijab in public places and in any identification photographs. Several municipalities are having to determine how to deal with producing identification photographs of Muslim women who are under arrest.

Ethnic relations

The authors Abdo Elkholy, Frances Trix, and Linda Walbridge, all, as paraphrased by Sally Howell, stated that "relations between Albanian Muslims and other Muslims in Detroit were limited at best."

Institutions
The Council on American-Islamic Relations (CAIR) has a Michigan chapter, headquartered in Southfield.

Individual mosques

Mosques in Dearborn include the Islamic Center of America and the Dearborn Mosque. The First Albanian Bektashi Tekke in America serves the Albanian-American Bektashi Sufi community.

In Hamtramck the Bengali community has established mosques, including Al-Islah Jamee Masjid.  In addition, in Hamtramck the Yemeni community established the Mu'ath bin Jabal Mosque, which was established in 1976. In 2005 the mosque, located just outside the south eastern border of Hamtramck, was the largest mosque out of the ten within a three-mile radius.

The Ahmadiyya Muslim Community USA has a Metro Detroit chapter, and the Ahmadiyya Muslim Community Center is in Rochester Hills.

The First Albanian Bektashi Monastery (Tekke) opened in Taylor in 1953. Baba Rexheb, an Albanian Sufi, had established it. In 1963, the Albanian Islamic Center in Harper Woods opened.

Education
Islamic day schools in the Detroit area include:
 International Islamic Academy (IIA) - Detroit - Formed in 2011 by the merger of Dar Alarqam School and Al Ihsan Academy
 Muslim American Youth Academy (MAYA) of the Islamic Center of America - Dearborn
As of 2015 Michigan Islamic Academy, a K-12 Islamic day school in Ann Arbor, has students who come from Metro Detroit.

Public schools
In a thirty-year period ending sometime prior to 2010 Dearborn Public Schools and Detroit Public Schools both developed policies to accommodate Arab and Muslim students in collaboration with administrators, parents, teachers, and students. Policies adopted by the districts included observances of Muslim holidays, Arabic-language programs, policies concerning prayer, and rules regarding modesty of females in physical education and sports. Since the early 1980s Dearborn district schools have vegetarian meals as alternative to non-halal meals. As of 2010 some schools use discretionary funds to offer halal meals, but most schools do not offer halal meals since they cannot get affordable prices from distributors.

In 2005 Highland Park Schools made plans to attract Arab and Muslim students resident in Detroit and Hamtramck. Dr. Theresa Saunders, the superintendent of the school system, hired Yahya Alkebsi, a Yemeni-American educator, as the district's Arab Muslim consultant. It added Arabic-speaking teachers and began offering instruction in Arabic. Sally Howell, author of Competing for Muslims: New Strategies for Urban Renewal in Detroit, said that the district began treating "Muslim families more directly like consumers". Howell said that the district agreed "to segregate Muslim students from mainstream classrooms" but that the district routinely denied that this was the case. Alkebsi said that he would bring halal food to HPS schools, but he was unable to do so. The district instead had vegetarian options.

Cuisine
The number of halal-certified restaurants in Metro Detroit grew from 89 in 2010 to 236 in 2014.

Notable residents
Religious leaders:
 Hassan Al-Qazwini (Iraqi Shia Muslim)
 Baba Rexheb (Albanian Sufi Muslim)
 

Elected officials:
 Abdullah Hammoud (Michigan House of Representatives, 15th District, 2016–present)
 Rashida Tlaib (Michigan House of Representatives, 6th District, 2009-2014), (US House of Representatives, 13th District, 2019–present)

Rima Fakih winner of the Miss USA and Miss Michigan pageants in 2010.

See also
 Religion in Metro Detroit
 Interfaith Leadership Council of Metropolitan Detroit
Ethnic groups:
 History of the Middle Eastern people in Metro Detroit
 History of the Albanian Americans in Metro Detroit.

References
 Howell, Sally. Old Islam in Detroit: Rediscovering the Muslim American Past. Oxford University Press, 2014. , 9780199372003.
 Howell, Sally. "Competing for Muslims: New Strategies for Urban Renewal in Detroit". Located in: Shryock, Andrew (editor). Islamophobia/Islamophilia: Beyond the Politics of Enemy and Friend. Indiana University Press, June 30, 2010. , 9780253004543.

Notes

External links
 CAIR Michigan
 Building Islam in Detroit: Foundations, Forms, Futures - University of Michigan

 
Religion in Detroit